Glasgow Springburn was a constituency of the Scottish Parliament (Holyrood). It elected one Member of the Scottish Parliament (MSP) by the plurality (first past the post) method of election.
From the 2011 election, the constituency was abolished and subsumed into a larger Glasgow Maryhill and Springburn seat.

Electoral region 

The region covered the Glasgow City council area and a north-western portion of the South Lanarkshire council area.

Constituency boundaries 

The Glasgow Springburn constituency was created at the same time as the Scottish Parliament, in 1999, with the name and boundaries of an  existing Westminster constituency. In 2005, however, Scottish Westminster (House of Commons) constituencies were mostly replaced with new constituencies.

The Holyrood constituency was entirely within the Glasgow City council area, on its northern boundary. It was west of the Baillieston constituency, north of Shettleston, northeast of Kelvin and east of Maryhill, which were also entirely within the city area.

Boundary review 

Following their First Periodic review into constituencies to the Scottish Parliament in time for the 2011 election, the Boundary Commission for Scotland recommended the effective merger of the Glasgow Springburn and Glasgow Maryhill constituencies. The new creation is a constituency known as Glasgow Maryhill and Springburn.

Member of the Scottish Parliament

Election results

Notes

See also
 Politics of Glasgow

Scottish Parliament constituencies and regions 1999–2011
Politics of Glasgow
1999 establishments in Scotland
Constituencies established in 1999
2011 disestablishments in Scotland
Constituencies disestablished in 2011
Springburn